Charles Scribner's Sons, or simply Scribner's or Scribner, is an American publisher based in New York City, known for publishing American authors including Henry James, Ernest Hemingway, F. Scott Fitzgerald, Kurt Vonnegut, Marjorie Kinnan Rawlings, Stephen King, Robert A. Heinlein, Thomas Wolfe, George Santayana, John Clellon Holmes, Don DeLillo, and Edith Wharton.

The firm published Scribner's Magazine for many years. More recently, several Scribner titles and authors have garnered Pulitzer Prizes, National Book Awards and other merits. In 1978 the company merged with Atheneum and became The Scribner Book Companies. In turn it merged into Macmillan in 1984.

Simon & Schuster bought Macmillan in 1994. By this point only the trade book and reference book operations still bore the original family name. After the merger, the Macmillan and Atheneum adult lists were merged into Scribner's and the Scribner's children list was merged into Atheneum. The former imprint, now simply "Scribner", was retained by Simon & Schuster, while the reference division has been owned by Gale since 1999. , Scribner is a division of Simon & Schuster under the title Scribner Publishing Group which also includes the Touchstone Books imprint.

The president of Scribner  is Susan Moldow (who also held the position of publisher from 1994 to 2012), and the current publisher is Nan Graham.

History 
The firm was founded in 1846 by Charles Scribner I and Isaac D. Baker as "Baker & Scribner." After Baker's death, Scribner bought the remainder of the company and renamed it the "Charles Scribner Company." In 1865, the company made its first venture into magazine publishing with Hours at Home.

In 1870, the Scribners organized a new firm, Scribner and Company, to publish a magazine entitled Scribner's Monthly. After the death of Charles Scribner I in 1871, his son John Blair Scribner took over as president of the company. His other sons Charles Scribner II and Arthur Hawley Scribner would also join the firm, in 1875 and 1884. They each later served as presidents. When the other partners in the venture sold their stake to the family, the company was renamed Charles Scribner's Sons.

The company launched St. Nicholas Magazine in 1873 with Mary Mapes Dodge as editor and Frank R. Stockton as assistant editor; it became well known as a children's magazine. When the Scribner family sold the magazine company to outside investors in 1881, Scribner's Monthly was renamed the Century Magazine. The Scribners brothers were enjoined from publishing any magazine for a period of five years.

In 1886, at the expiration of this term, they launched Scribner's Magazine. The firm's headquarters were in the Scribner Building, built in 1893, on lower Fifth Avenue at 21st Street, and later in the Charles Scribner's Sons Building, on Fifth Avenue in midtown. Both buildings were designed by Ernest Flagg in a Beaux Arts style.

The children's book division was established in 1934 under the leadership of Alice Dalgliesh. It published works by distinguished authors and illustrators including N.C. Wyeth, Robert A. Heinlein, Marcia Brown, Will James, Marjorie Kinnan Rawlings, and Leo Politi.

Scribner merged with Atheneum in 1978, and then merged into Macmillan in 1984. In 1994, Macmillan was bought by Simon & Schuster.

 the publisher is owned by the CBS Corporation.

Simon & Schuster reorganized their adult imprints into four divisions in 2012. Scribner became the Scribner Publishing Group and would expand to include Touchstone Books which had previously been part of Free Press. The other divisions are Atria Publishing Group, Simon & Schuster Publishing Group, and the Gallery Publishing Group. The new Scribner division would be led by Susan Moldow as president.

Presidents 
 Charles Scribner I (1821–1871), 1846 to 1871
 John Blair Scribner (1850–1879), 1871 to 1879
 Charles Scribner II (1854–1930), 1879 to 1930
 Arthur Hawley Scribner (1859–1932), circa 1900
 Charles Scribner III (1890–1952), 1932 to 1952
 Charles Scribner IV (1921–1995), 1952 to 1984

Notable authors

Notable authors under Charles Scribner II 
 Edith Wharton
 Henry James

Notable authors under Charles Scribner's Sons 
 Ernest Hemingway
 Marjorie Kinnan Rawlings
 Ring Lardner
 Thomas Wolfe
 Reinhold Niebuhr
 Susanne Langer

Notable authors under Maxwell Perkins and John Hall Wheelock 
 F. Scott Fitzgerald
 Thomas Wolfe
 Ernest Hemingway
 Ring Lardner
 Erskine Caldwell
 S. S. Van Dine
 James Jones
 Alan Paton

Notable authors under Simon and Schuster 
Simon & Schuster has published thousands of books from thousands of authors. This list represents some of the more notable authors (those who are culturally significant or have had several bestsellers) from Scribner since becoming part of Simon & Schuster. For a more extensive list see List of Simon & Schuster authors.
 Annie Proulx
 Andrew Solomon
 Anthony Doerr
 Don DeLillo
 Frank McCourt
 Stephen King (1998–present for new releases; 2016–present for re-releases in US/Canada)
 Jeanette Walls

Names 
 Baker & Scribner, until the death of Baker in 1850
 Charles Scribner Company
 Charles Scribner's Sons
 Scribner

Bookstores 
The Scribner Bookstores are now owned by Barnes & Noble.

See also 

 Charles Scribner I
 Scribner's Monthly
 Scribner's Magazine
 Simon & Schuster
 Scribner Building

References

Further reading 
 Roger Burlingame, Of Making Many Books: A Hundred Years of Reading, Writing and Publishing, New York: Charles Scribner's Sons, 1946; Pennsylvania State University Press, 1996 (Penn State Series in the History of the Book).
 Robert Trogdon, The Lousy Racket: Hemingway, Scribners, and the Business of Literature, Kent State University Press, 2007.

External links 

 The House of Scribner
 Charles Scribner's Sons at Thomson Gale
 Archives of Charles Scribner's Sons at the Princeton University Library, Manuscript Division
 Charles Scribner's Sons Art Reference Department records at the Smithsonian Archives of American Art
 Charles Scribner's Sons: An Illustrated Chronology Princeton Library

 
Book publishing companies based in New York (state)
Publishing companies based in New York City
Simon & Schuster
Publishing companies established in 1846
1846 establishments in New York (state)
Barnes & Noble
Cengage
Princeton University